Abdul Haq al-Turkistani is a Uyghur Islamic militant who leads the Turkistan Islamic Party. The United States Treasury reported he took over leadership of the organization in 2003, following the death of its previous leader, and took a seat on al-Qaeda's shura (central committee) in 2005.

Biography

In October 2008, Chinese security officials asserted that his real name is Memetiming Memeti (Uyghur: مۇھەممەتئىمىن مەمەت Memtimin Memet). They published half a dozen aliases. They reported he left China in March 1998, and became a trainer at a camp in a "South Asian country".

The United Nations Security Council's 1267 Committee placed him on a list of individuals suspected of having ties to Osama bin Laden. He was a member of al-Qaeda's leadership council. Uyghur detainees at Guantanamo bay "confessed" that they were trained by Abdul Haq and Hassan Mahsum in Afghanistan. Haq threatened terrorist attacks on the 2008 Beijing Olympics. Al-Qaeda's command viewed Abdul Haq as authoritative and sent him to meet with Taliban factions along with al-Qaeda commanders.

Abdul Haq faced allegations from the US Treasury Department that he was behind a bombing that preceded the Beijing Olympics.

On 1 March 2010, Abdul Haq was reported to have been killed by a missile launched from an unmanned drone on 15 February 2010. It took place in North Waziristan's area of Mir Ali in Zor Babar Aidak town. However, in June 2014, it was reported that Abdul Haq was instead severely wounded, but recovered and resumed leadership in 2014.

References

1971 births
Chinese Islamists
Living people
Turkistan Islamic Party
Leaders of Islamic terror groups
Chinese al-Qaeda members